Charles Jay Sykes (born November 11, 1954) is an American political commentator who is currently editor-in-chief of the website The Bulwark. From 1993 to 2016, Sykes hosted a conservative talk show on WTMJ in Milwaukee, Wisconsin. He was also the editor of Right Wisconsin which was co-owned with WTMJ's then-parent company E. W. Scripps.

Early life and education
Charles Jay Sykes was born in 1954 in Seattle, Washington, and later grew up in New York and Fox Point, Wisconsin. He is the son of Katherine "Kay" Border and Jay G. Sykes, a lawyer who later worked as a journalist for several small newspapers in New York before settling with the Milwaukee Sentinel in 1962. Jay later became a lecturer in journalism at the University of Wisconsin–Milwaukee, a board member of the American Civil Liberties Union Wisconsin chapter, and ran for Lieutenant Governor of Wisconsin unsuccessfully against Martin J. Schreiber in the 1970 Democratic primary.

After graduating from Nicolet High School, Sykes enrolled at the University of Wisconsin–Milwaukee, where in 1975 he graduated summa cum laude with a bachelor's degree in English. While at Milwaukee, Sykes was a member of the Young Democrats, and following a nonreligious upbringing, Sykes converted to Roman Catholicism at age 18. In 1974, using the slogan "A Different Kind of Democrat" due to his opposition to abortion, Sykes challenged Republican incumbent Jim Sensenbrenner for Wisconsin State Assembly and lost. As Milwaukee Magazine profiled, "his pro-life campaign signaled a growing crack in his liberalism. And as elements within the antiwar movement became violent, he became increasingly disillusioned."

Career

Writing
Sykes began his career as a journalist, starting in 1975 with West Allis, Wisconsin weekly The Northeast Post for a year. In 1976, Sykes joined The Milwaukee Journal, starting with reporting on stories in the North Shore suburbs, before being promoted to the Milwaukee City Hall beat during the administration of Mayor Henry Maier.

After seven years of reporting in the Milwaukee area, Sykes moved to Cleveland in 1982 as a staff writer for Cleveland Magazine, but the magazine went out of business by the end of the year. In 1983 Sykes returned to Milwaukee as managing editor at Milwaukee Magazine and moved up to editor-in-chief in January 1984. Sykes wrote features, investigative articles, and commentary for Milwaukee Magazine.

Sykes is a published author, primarily concerning education. He made his book debut in 1988 with Profscam: Professors and the Demise of Higher Education, inspired by his father's essay published posthumously in the October 1985 Milwaukee Magazine recalling his experience teaching at the University of Wisconsin–Milwaukee.

In addition, Sykes has written commentary for Imprimis, The New York Times, The Wall Street Journal and has edited WI Interest, the magazine of the Badger Institute (formerly the Wisconsin Policy Research Institute) and the website Right Wisconsin.

Since December 2018, Sykes has been editor-in-chief of The Bulwark.

Radio and podcasting
In an era when the national success of Rush Limbaugh was inspiring similar call-in talk radio shows around the U.S., Sykes started hosting talk radio in 1989 as a substitute host for Mark Belling at WISN in Milwaukee. Sykes got his own show on WISN by 1992. Lacking a contract with WISN, Sykes jumped to WTMJ within a year and hosted a morning show there until December 19, 2016.

In 2002, Sykes and fellow WTMJ host Jeff Wagner gained prominence in leading a campaign to recall Milwaukee County Executive Tom Ament, who was embroiled in scandal for changing the county pension policy to give himself and close aides large payouts; Ament controversially retired at the end of February 2002, rather than resign, to retain his pension.

In a 2005 speech, Jay Heck, executive director of the Wisconsin branch of the liberal political advocacy group Common Cause referred to Sykes's influence on local politicians. "The Sykes Republicans from southeastern Wisconsin are worried that he will castigate them by calling them RINOs, 'Republicans in name only.' So (he makes it) very difficult for Republicans to be independent of the party line on any issue."

On July 26, 2005, WTMJ settled a libel lawsuit against Sykes for $5,000 with Spanish Journal editor Robert Miranda, over a November 2004 blog post by Sykes that alleged that Miranda in 1991 organized a protest that became violent in opposition to a "pro-American" rally at the University of Wisconsin–Milwaukee, information that Sykes later retracted.

Sykes did not support the Donald Trump presidential 2016 bid, campaigning against him and instead choosing to cast a write-in vote for independent conservative candidate Evan McMullin.

In October 2016, Sykes announced that he had decided late in 2015 to quit his radio show for unspecified personal reasons. In December 2016, Sykes wrote an op-ed for The New York Times suggesting that the conservative movement had lost its way during the 2016 campaign, saying "...as we learned this year, we had succeeded in persuading our audiences to ignore and discount any information from the mainstream media. Over time, we'd succeeded in delegitimizing the media altogether — all the normal guideposts were down, the referees discredited."

From January to April 2017, Sykes was part of a rotating set of hosts of Indivisible, a call-in talk show distributed by WNYC public radio in New York City, along with Brian Lehrer of WNYC and Kerri Miller of Minnesota Public Radio among others. The show analyzed and discussed the first 100 days of President Donald Trump's new administration.

In February 2018, Sykes became the new host of The Daily Standard, the revived podcast of The Weekly Standard magazine.

Sykes is the founder and editor-at-large of The Bulwark and currently the host of "The Bulwark Podcast."

Television
Sykes was an investigative reporter at WISN-TV in 1983. From 1993 to 2016, he hosted the local Sunday morning talk show Sunday Insight for WTMJ-TV. In 1994, Sykes contributed an essay to the ITVS series "Declarations: Essays on American Ideals", which was broadcast on PBS stations.

Personal life
In 1980, Sykes married Diane S. Sykes who went on to become a Wisconsin Supreme Court Justice and then a judge on the United States Court of Appeals for the Seventh Circuit. The couple had two children and divorced in 1999.  In 2000, Sykes married Janet Riordan.

Sykes voted for Joe Biden in the 2020 U.S. Presidential election.

Bibliography

See also
List of Republicans opposing Donald Trump presidential campaign, 2016

References

Further reading

External links

1954 births
Living people
American bloggers
American newspaper journalists
American podcasters
American political commentators
American talk radio hosts
American television journalists
Catholics from Washington (state)
American conservative talk radio hosts
Journalists from Washington (state)
MSNBC people
Radio personalities from Seattle
University of Wisconsin–Milwaukee alumni
Wisconsin Democrats
Wisconsin Republicans
People from Fox Point, Wisconsin
21st-century American non-fiction writers
Catholics from Wisconsin
People from Mequon, Wisconsin
Converts to Roman Catholicism from atheism or agnosticism
American people of Jewish descent
Criticism of Donald Trump